A kenzan (剣山), also called spiky frog, is a specific device used in the Japanese art of flower arrangement ikebana for fixing the flowers in the container. It consists of a heavy lead plate with erected brass needles where the stipes are fixed.

The name kenzan (剣山) literally means sword mountain.  It was introduced by the Moribana style of ikebana.

Another flower holder without spikes but only holes is called shippo dome (七宝留め) and is used by the Saga Go-ryū school and sometimes other schools.

References

See also
Flower frog

Ikebana
Floristry